Robert V. Pelkington Sr. (September 6, 1941 –  January 31, 2016) was an American basketball player for Xavier University from 1960 to 1964.

Pelkington was one of the best rebounders of his era. During his senior year, he led the nation in rebounds per game at 21.8. His 16.6 career average is still the highest in school history.

He died on January 31, 2016, at the age of 74.

References

1941 births
2016 deaths
American men's basketball players
Centers (basketball)
Philadelphia 76ers draft picks
Basketball players from Akron, Ohio
Basketball players from Fort Wayne, Indiana
Xavier Musketeers men's basketball players